Fakir Dungaria (born 6 October 1969) was an Indian cricketer who played for Gujarat.  He made a single first-class appearance for the side, during the 1991-92 season, against Baroda. From the lower-middle order, he scored 21 runs in the first innings in which he batted, and 9 runs in the second.

Dungaria is from a small town called Daman in India. In 1985 he started playing cricket for local clubs called Jawan Tandel (Daman) and Vadilal CC (Vapi).  He was spotted by Maheshbhai Pithawalla from Bhimpore, Surat. In 1987, Pithawalla offered him an open invitation to play for his own club called Pithawalla Sports Club. Dungaria accepted and delivered strong performances at the level of club and a Surat district cricket association. By 1992 he played for Gujarat Under-19 and a Ranji trophy for Gujarat, Same year 1992 Fakir Dungaria left india to settle down in the UK.

Between 1993 and 2008, Dungaria played for Broadstairs cricket club in Kent Cricket League. Since 2009, Dungaria has played for Radlett in the Home Counties Premier League. He also played for Uxbridge Middlesex League, Syston Leicestershire league, and Hertfordshire cricket league for Broxbourne cricket club as well as few more cricket club in various leagues in the UK. In 2016 Dungaria went back to his old club Radlett CC playing 1st team cricket in Saracens Hertfordshire Premier Cricket League.

In 2020 he played for Hertfordshire Over50’s  and  same year he made into the England Over50’s  (International) to play against Wales.

Currently in 2022 Fakir playing for Middlesex Over50’s County cricket.

Recently in 2022 Fakir Dungaria joined the Middlesex county cricket to play Over50’s and the same year Fakir made a debut for India Over50’s (International) after a successful switching from England Over50’s.

https://www.espncricinfo.com/player/fakir-dungaria-28295

External links
Fakir Dungaria at Cricket Archive 

1969 births
Living people
Indian cricketers
Gujarat cricketers